To Be Continued is a 2018 Latvian documentary film directed by Ivars Seleckis. It was selected as the Latvian entry for the Best Foreign Language Film at the 91st Academy Awards, but it was not nominated.

Overview
Over the course of two years, director Ivars Seleckis profiles seven children from all walks of life across Latvia. The film's international premiere was at 49th edition of Visions du Réel in 2018, one of the leading international documentary film festivals in Europe, held in Nyon, Switzerland. The film received three awards at the Latvian National Film Awards - Best Documentary Film Director (Ivars Seleckis), Best Documentary Film Cinematographer (Valdis Celmiņš), and Best Editor (Andra Doršs).

See also
 List of submissions to the 91st Academy Awards for Best Foreign Language Film
 List of Latvian submissions for the Academy Award for Best Foreign Language Film

References

External links
 

2018 films
2018 documentary films
Latvian documentary films
Latvian-language films